Yasuhira Kiyohara (married name Yasuhira Yukawa; 14 January 1914 – 7 April 2001) was a Japanese second lieutenant of the Imperial army who was sentenced to indefinite  imprisonment for directing a mob in the February 26 Incident of 1936. He was assigned to the  3rd Company, 3rd Infantry Regiment. He was granted amnesty in December 1941.

After amnesty, he became the president of an airplane company. After the World War II, he was engaged in various enterprises related to Korea since he was acquainted with Korean President Park Chung-hee.

Life
He was born in Kumamoto Prefecture in 1914.

Attempted coup d'état (February 26 Incident)
The February 26 incident was an attempted coup d'état in Japan, from February 26 to 29, 1936, carried out by 1,483 troops of the Imperial Japanese Army who believed that those around Emperor Hirohito were morally corrupt. Several leading politicians were killed, and the center of Tokyo was briefly occupied by the rebelling troops. The coup, however, was a failure.

Seicho Matsumoto and Kiyohara
Seicho Matsumoto (松本 清張, Matsumoto Seicho) was one of the most influential writers of the history of modern Japan as well as of mystery novels. In his Showa Shi Hakkutsu 『昭和史発掘』, Matsumoto cited what Yasuhira Kiyohara later revealed in 1986.  Kiyohara stated that he led his group of soldiers to the front of the Imperial Palace without any machine guns or weapons. Matsumoto believes that they were immature and misunderstood Emperor Hirohito. Kiyohara said in a round-table discussion that "it was our program that we enter the Palace with the permission of Emperor Hirohito through Military Officer General to his Majesty Honjo.  However, Emperor Hirohito was very furious at our coup d'état."

Konpaku
He wrote a book titled Konpaku in which he describes the coup and Chizuko Mifune, a younger sister of his mother.

References
An hour with Park Chung-hee. Yasuhira Yukawa, Bungei Shunju January Issue of 1962.
This is the Showa Revolution, Yasuhira Yukawa et al. Bungei Shunju February issue of 1967.

Footnotes

Imperial Japanese Army officers
1914 births
2001 deaths
People from Uki, Kumamoto